Nikol Tallinn is a defunct Estonian football club. The club was formed in 1992 on the base of TVMK Tallinn (known as TVMV Tallinn at the time). The club existed for two years and served as a prototype for the creation  of Lantana Tallinn two years later.

Achievements
Estonian Cup: (1)
1992–93

Nikol Tallinn in Estonian Football

Nikol Tallinn in Europe
 1Q = First Qualifying Round
 2Q = Second Qualifying Round

References

 
Nikol Tallinn
Nikol Tallinn
Nikol Tallinn
1951 establishments in Estonia
1994 disestablishments in Estonia